is the fifth studio album by Japanese singer/songwriter Hideaki Tokunaga. Released on May 21, 1989, the album sold over 300,000 copies and peaked at No. 4 in Oricon's albums chart and was ranked at No. 46 in Oricon's 1989 year-ending album chart. It was also certified Gold by the RIAJ.

The album features the singles "Saigo no Iiwake", "Koibito", and "Myself ~Kaze ni Naritai~" / "Kokoro no Ball". The English-language song "You're in the Sky ~Eolia~" was used for TV commercials promoting Panasonic's Eolia air conditioner line.

Track listing 
All music is composed by Hideaki Tokunaga and arranged by Ichizo Seo.

Personnel
Keyboards: Ryoichi Kuniyoshi, Yu Toyama, and Nobuo Kurata
Bass: Chiharu Mikuzuki
Drums: Hideo Yamaki, Toru Hasebe
Guitar: Tsuyoshi Ima, Masaki Matsubara, and Jun Kakuda
Saxophone: Jake H. Conception
Manipulator: Nobuhiko Nakayama, Keiji Urata, and Jun Toyama
Chorus: Takafumi Hiyama, Yasuhiro Kido, and Junko Hirotani

Charts

Certification

References

External links
Official website (Hideaki Tokunaga)
 (Universal Music Japan)

1989 albums
Japanese-language albums